Australian Wildlife is an Australian television series which aired in 1963 on ABC. It debuted 7 July 1963 and consisted of five half-hour episodes. It was filmed in Victoria and the islands off the south-east coast. It was a documentary series about Australian wildlife.

References

External links
Australian Wildlife on IMDb

1960s Australian documentary television series
1963 Australian television series debuts
1963 Australian television series endings
Australian Broadcasting Corporation original programming
English-language television shows
Black-and-white Australian television shows